Julio Christian Sieburger (5 March 1892 – ?) was an Argentine sailor and Olympic medalist. He competed at the 1936 and 1948 Olympics.

He was a member of the Argentine crew on Djinn that received a silver medal in the 6 metre class  at the 1948 Summer Olympics in London. His teammates included his brother Enrique Sieburger, Sr. while his son Roberto Sieburger was also competing in a different event (Three Person Keelboat) in the first of his five Olympics.

References

1892 births
Year of death unknown
Argentine male sailors (sport)
Olympic sailors of Argentina
Sailors at the 1936 Summer Olympics – 6 Metre
Sailors at the 1948 Summer Olympics – 6 Metre
Olympic silver medalists for Argentina
Argentine people of German descent
Olympic medalists in sailing
Medalists at the 1948 Summer Olympics